Once and Again is an American television drama series created by Ed Zwick and Marshall Herskovitz and produced by The Bedford Falls Company and Touchstone Television. The show originally aired in the United States on ABC between September 21, 1999, and April 15, 2002, with 63 episodes split over three seasons. The series stars Sela Ward and Billy Campbell as Lily Manning and Rick Sammler, two divorced parents who begin a romance. The series follows their relationship and the effect it has on their respective families.

Once and Again garnered acclaim and amassed 37 nominations for various industry awards. This includes 5 Emmy awards (with 1 win), 5 Golden Globe awards (with 1 win), 3 TCA awards, 2 Q awards (with 1 win), and a Writers Guild of America awards.

Awards and nominations

Emmy Awards

Presented by the Academy of Television Arts & Sciences since 1949, the Primetime Emmy Award is an annual accolade that honors outstanding achievements in various aspects of television such as acting, directing and writing. Once and Again received 5 nominations, winning one award for Outstanding Lead Actress in a Drama Series, awarded to Sela Ward.

Primetime Emmy Awards

Creative Arts Emmy Awards

Golden Globe Awards

The Golden Globe Award is an annual accolade presented by the Hollywood Foreign Press Association (HFPA) which honors the best performances in television and film. Once and Again received five nominations, winning two awards for Best Television Series – Drama.

Q Awards
The Q Award, presented by the Viewers for Quality Television since 1986, recognizes critically acclaimed programs and performers for their outstanding achievements in television. During its tenure, Once and Again won an award for Best Actress in a Quality Drama Series received by Sela Ward.

Satellite Awards
During its tenure, Once and Again received three award nominations for a Satellite Award.

TV Guide Awards

Television Critics Association Awards
Awarded by the Television Critics Association since 1985, the Television Critics Association Award (TCA Award) is an annual accolade that recognizes outstanding achievements in television programming and acting performances. Once and Again received three nominations.

Other awards

References

External links
 List of Primetime Emmy Awards received by Once and Again
 List of awards and nominations received by Once and Again at the Internet Movie Database

Once and Again